Nationality words link to articles with information on the nation's poetry or literature (for instance, Irish or France).

Events

Works published

Great Britain
 Anonymous, publication year conjectural, Alexander the Great
 Anonymous,  ("A Book of a Ghostly Father"), London: Wynkyn de Worde; (1521 has also been suggested as the most likely year of publication)
 John Constable, Epigrammata
 Robert Copland, London: Wynkyn de Worde
 Anonymous, a translation of Terence, Paris
 Christopher Goodwyn, London: Wynkyn de Worde
 William Hendred, publication year conjectural, The Pilgrimage of Mankind
 John Lydgate, publication year conjectural, Testament
 William Walter (poet), The Spectacle of Louers, London: Wynkyn de Worde

Other
 Ulrich von Hutten, Aufwecker der teutschen Nation, a satiric poem, the author's earliest work in German

Births
Death years link to the corresponding "[year] in poetry" article:
 Hernando de Acuña born about this year (died 1580), Spanish
 Giovanni Bona de Boliris (died 1572), Humanist, poet and writer, who wrote in Latin and Italian
 Thomas Churchyard, birth year uncertain (died 1604), English author and poet
 Natalis Comes (died 1582), Italian mythographer, poet and historian
 Pernette Du Guillet (died 1545), French
 William Lauder, year uncertain (died 1573), Scottish cleric, playwright, and poet
 Madeleine Des Roches born about this year (died 1587), French author and poet who published works jointly with her daughter, Catherine Des Roches; the two also hosted a literary salon which included Scévole de Sainte-Marthe, Barnabé Brisson, René Chopin, Antoine Loisel, Claude Binet, Nicolas Rapin and Odet de Turnèbe
 Alexander Scott (died 1582/1583), Scottish
 Georg Thym born about this year (died 1560), German teacher, poet and writer

Deaths
Birth years link to the corresponding "[year] in poetry" article:
 William Dunbar, death year uncertain (born c. 1460), Scottish
 William Hendred (born 1470), English

See also

 Poetry
 16th century in poetry
 16th century in literature
 Dutch Renaissance and Golden Age literature
 French Renaissance literature
 Grands Rhétoriqueurs
 Renaissance literature
 Spanish Renaissance literature

Notes

16th-century poetry
Poetry